Manoj Paramahamsa is an Indian cinematographer, who has worked in Tamil, Telugu and Malayalam film industries.

Career
He was born in Chennai, Tamil Nadu. His father UV Babu, has directed more than half-a-dozen films in Telugu and Manoj has said that "he was the one who wanted me to become a cinematographer". He would accompany his father to shoots and said that he was "fascinated by cinematography, the mystery of the camera and lights". Educated at the M.G.R. Government Film and Television Training Institute of Tamil Nadu at Chennai, he received his early training from the cinematographer S. Saravanan. Manoj started his career by assisting in films such as Pammal K. Sambandam, Arasatchi, Priyamana Thozhi, Madhurey, Thirupaachi and Thirupathi, as well as other films in Telugu, Malayalam and Tamil, before becoming independent. He assisted him for seven years.

Manoj's debut film was Eeram directed by Arivazhagan, and produced by noted director S. Shankar under his banner S Pictures. He received wide critical praise for his work in the film. Sify wrote, "it is Manoj Paramahamsa’s camera which is the real hero of the film. As a cameraman he is able to give the entire film the hazy blue look using Cyan color by the removal of red from white light for the first time in Tamil cinema, creating the eerie atmosphere and stillness against the continuous beating of the rains". Similarly, Rediff wrote, "Manoj Paramahamsa's camerawork is refreshing: somber and serious, with rain always threatening in some form in the present; normal and sunny in the Trichy flashback sequences".

In 2010, he worked on Gautham Vasudev Menon's romance film Vinnaithaandi Varuvaayaa and its Telugu remake Ye Maaya Chesave, winning the Filmfare Award for Best Cinematographer - South for the latter. He also handled cinematography for Menon's psychological thriller, Nadunisi Naaygal starring Sameera Reddy. He worked in the remake of 3 Idiots in Tamil, Nanban, which was directed by S. Shankar.

He turned producer with the adventure film Poovarasam Peepee. He is also working with Vijay on Thalapathy 67, after Nanban and Beast.

Filmography

References

External links
 
 

Tamil film cinematographers
Cinematographers from Tamil Nadu
Living people
Filmfare Awards South winners
1981 births
M.G.R. Government Film and Television Training Institute alumni
Telugu film cinematographers
Kannada film cinematographers
Malayalam film cinematographers
Artists from Chennai
Tamil film producers
21st-century Indian photographers